South Africa competed at the 2019 African Games held from 19 to 31 August 2019 in Rabat, Morocco. In total, 153 athletes represented South Africa in 11 sports. Athletes representing South Africa won 36 gold medals, 26 silver medals and 25 bronze medals and the country finished in 3rd place in the medal table.

Medal summary

Medal table 

|  style="text-align:left; width:78%; vertical-align:top;"|

|  style="text-align:left; width:22%; vertical-align:top;"|

Archery 

South Africa competed in archery. Morgan Blewett, Vivien De Klerk, Rhyn Potgieter and Catharina Whitehead represented South Africa in archery.

Blewett, De Klerk and Potgieter competed in the men's individual and men's team events. Whitehead competed in the women's individual event. Whitehead and De Klerk also competed in the mixed team event.

Athletics 

38 athletes were scheduled to compete in athletes. Antonio Alkana, Lindsay Hanekom, Zenéy van der Walt and Sunette Viljoen were among the athletes to compete in the 2019 African Games.

In total, athletes representing South Africa won one gold medal, six silver medals and ten bronze medals and the country finished in 10th place in the athletics medal table.

Badminton 

South Africa competed in badminton with 8 athletes (4 men's and 4 women's).

Johanita Scholtz won the gold medal in the women's singles event.

Megan de Beer and Johanita Scholtz won the bronze medal in the women's doubles event.

In the team event South Africa also won a bronze medal.

Beach volleyball 

Grant Goldschmidt and Leo Williams competed in the men's beach volleyball tournament. They finished in 4th place.

Canoeing 

Bridgitte Hartley is part of the team to represent South Africa in canoeing at the 2019 African Games.

Cycling 

South Africa competed in cycling.

The following athletes represented South Africa in cycling: 

 Men: Ryan Gibbons, Stefan de Bod, Jayde Julius, Clint Hendricks, Kent Main, Jason Oosthuizen
 Women: Ashleigh Moolman-Pasio, Maroesjka Matthee, Joanna van de Winkel, Zanri Rossouw, Carla Oberholzer, Tiffany Keep

In total, cyclists representing South Africa won six gold medals and three silver medals and the country finished 1st in the cycling medal table.

Football 

South Africa competed in football at the 2019 African Games, both in the men's tournament and the women's tournament.

In both tournaments the teams did not advance from the group stage to the semi-finals. Both the men's team and women's team lost all their matches.

Judo 

South Africa competed in judo. In total five athletes represented South Africa in judo.

Two medals were won:

 Women -48kg:  Geronay Whitebooi
 Women -78kg:  Unelle Snyman

Karate 

South Africa competed in karate.

Swimming 

24 swimmers were scheduled to compete in the 2019 African Games. Michael Houlie represented South Africa at the 2019 African Games.

South Africa finished in 1st place in the swimming medal table with 20 gold medals, 13 silver medals and 12 bronze medals.

Table tennis 

South Africa competed in table tennis.

Tennis 

Chanel Simmonds was the only player to represent South Africa in tennis at the 2019 African Games. She won the silver medal in the women's singles event.

Weightlifting 

Mona Pretorius was one of the weightlifters to represent South Africa at the 2019 African Games.

References 

Nations at the 2019 African Games
2019
African Games